Alan Sedgwick Barnes (9 October 1850 – 17 May 1915) was an English first-class cricketer who played for Marylebone Cricket Club (MCC) between 1877 and 1879 and for Derbyshire in 1878.

Barnes was born in Anfield, and his brother John was a barrister. Barnes made his debut cricketing appearance for MCC against South Wales Cricket Club during the 1874 season, in which, despite finishing on a duck in the first innings from the upper order, the team recovered to win by a comfortable margin. Barnes' debut first-class appearance came three years later, for MCC against Oxford University, in which the university side finished on 12 all out in the first innings, in a game scheduled for three days but finished in just a single day.

Barnes continued to play for MCC in the early part of the 1878 season. He also played three matches in a month for Derbyshire during the 1878 season. 
 
Barnes continued to play for Marylebone Cricket Club in 1879, with the team picking up two innings-margin victories from three wins and two losses.
 
Barnes was a right-handed batsman and played 20 innings in 13 first-class matches at an average of 5.94 and a top score on 16.

Barnes died in Twyford Abbey at the age of 64. His nephew, Ronald, played first-class cricket for Oxford University and, most notably, Marylebone Cricket Club, during the early part of the twentieth century.

References 

1850 births
1915 deaths
English cricketers
Marylebone Cricket Club cricketers
Derbyshire cricketers